The 2003–04 NBA season was the SuperSonics' 37th season in the National Basketball Association. During the offseason, the Sonics signed free agent Antonio Daniels. The Sonics started the season in Tokyo, Japan with a two game series against the Los Angeles Clippers. The Sonics got off to a 5–1 start, but played around .500 for the first half of the season. Ray Allen played his first full season as a member of the Sonics after being acquired from the Milwaukee Bucks in a trade last February. Despite missing the first 25 games due to an ankle injury, he was voted to play in the 2004 NBA All-Star Game. This was Allen's fourth overall All-Star Game appearance and his first as a member of the Sonics. However, despite a 7-game winning streak in March, the Sonics lost seven of their final ten games ending the season fifth in the Pacific Division with a 37–45 record tied with the Golden State Warriors, missing the playoffs. Following the season, Brent Barry signed as a free agent with the San Antonio Spurs.

This was also the Sonics' final season playing in the Pacific Division, as they moved to the new Northwest Division of the Western Conference next season.

Offseason

Draft picks

Roster

Regular season

Season standings

z - clinched division title
y - clinched division title
x - clinched playoff spot

Record vs. opponents

Player statistics

See also
 2003-04 NBA season

References

Seattle SuperSonics seasons